Range 3 Coast Land District is one of the 59 land districts of British Columbia, Canada, which are part of the cadastral divisions of British Columbia.

Islands

Campbell Island
Lady Douglas Island
Lake Island
Price Island
Swindle Island

Mountains

Kitasu Hill
Helmet Peak

Settlements

Anahim Lake
Bella Bella
Bella Coola
Chezacut
Chilanko Forks
Hagensborg
Klemtu
Ocean Falls
Shearwater
Towdystan

References

 
Land districts of British Columbia